"Those Memories of You" is a song written by Alan O'Bryant. It was first recorded by Bill & James Monroe in 1978 and later released as a single by Pam Tillis in 1986, whose version peaked at #55 on the Billboard Hot Country Singles chart.

In 1987, the song was recorded by Dolly Parton, Linda Ronstadt, and Emmylou Harris on their album, Trio. Released in August of 1987, it was the album's third single. It reached #5 on the Billboard Hot Country Singles chart in December and reached #1 on the RPM Country Tracks chart in Canada. 

A cover version by LeAnn Rimes was recorded for her second independent album under Nor Va Jak, From My Heart to Yours, released in 1992.

Music video
The video for the song starred Harry Dean Stanton.

Chart performance

References

1986 singles
1987 singles
1978 songs
Pam Tillis songs
Dolly Parton songs
Linda Ronstadt songs
Emmylou Harris songs
LeAnn Rimes songs
Warner Records singles